HNLMS Zeeleeuw (S803)  is a  of the Royal Netherlands Navy. She entered service in 1990 as the first submarine of the Walrus class, after the intended lead ship, was delayed for a long period following a serious fire during construction. Zeeleeuw has been deployed both for naval exercises and in combat operations around the world. Furthermore, the submarine plays an important role by performing intelligence operations. The submarine has undergone a mid-life maintenance and upgrade program between 2014 and 2016, and is currently in active service.

Activities
 In 2010 HNLMS Zeeleeuw took part in Operation Ocean Shield.

Maintenance and upgrade 
In 2014 HNLMS Zeeleeuw was taken out of service after years of service by the Royal Netherlands Navy to perform maintenance and modernize its systems. During the upgrade program, the submarine was upgraded with modern systems. The ageing GIPSY combat system was replaced with the more modern Guardion combat system. Besides changing the software suit, hardware components were either replaced or upgraded with newer versions. The Medium Range Sonar (MRS) and Long Range Sonar (LRS) were replaced. A new sonar was added, the Mine and Obstacle Avoidance Sonar (MOAS). The consoles and screens in the command room were upgraded to more modern versions, while the navigation and attack periscopes went from being depended on analog sensors to digital sensors. This was done by replacing several masts. Lastly, the Mark 48 torpedoes were upgraded from mod 4 to the more recent mod 7.

See also
 Ships of the Royal Netherlands Navy

References

External links 

 Koninklijke Marine
 Walrus-class submarines
 Walrusklasse onderzeeboten
 Onderzeeboot Zeeleeuw kan weer 10 jaar mee
 Opknapbeurt voegt dimensie toe
 Vernieuwde Zeeleeuw maakte grote sprong door de tijd

Walrus-class submarines
Submarines of the Netherlands
1987 ships
Ships built in Rotterdam